Ray Conway may refer to:

Ray Conway, character in General Hospital
Ray Conway, character in Accidents Happen